Eugene "Gene" Dynarski (September 13, 1933 – February 27, 2020) was an American actor. Three of the most popular projects that he has been involved with were two Steven Spielberg films, Duel and Close Encounters of the Third Kind, and the Westwood Studios computer game Command & Conquer: Red Alert.

Acting career
Dynarski acted on stage before he began working in films and on television.

In 1971's Duel, Dynarski had a small role as a truck driver in a cafe that was mistakenly identified by car driver David Mann (Dennis Weaver) as his tormenting truck driver that resulted in a short lived fight at Chuck's Cafe. In Command & Conquer: Red Alert, Dynarski plays a major supporting role as Soviet Premier Joseph Stalin, appearing throughout much of the game's Soviet campaign and, to a lesser extent, the Allied campaign. In the 1974 film Earthquake, Dynarski portrays Fred, a worker at the Mulholland Dam who becomes the first fatality of the disaster.

Dynarski also appeared in numerous television shows. He was one of 32 actors or actresses to have guest-starred in both the original Star Trek television series (episodes "Mudd's Women" and "The Mark of Gideon") and in one of the series' spin offs (Star Trek: The Next Generations "11001001"). In Monkees TV series, Dynarski played the Dragonman's sidekick, Toto, in the episode titled "Monkee Chow Mein" (original US air date: March 13, 1967). His many other TV credits include episodes of Batman (episodes 47 and 48), Starsky & Hutch, CHiPs, Little House on the Prairie and The A-Team. Dynarski is also known for his two appearances as Izzy Mandelbaum Jr. on Seinfeld. Dynarski appeared in the short Apple Jack (2003) as Helmut Jitters.

Dynarski and David Weitz, a friend, built the Gene Dynarski Theater, which opened June 20, 1979, in Los Angeles. Over  years they converted a bare four-walled space into a 99-seat theater.

Death
Dynarski died on February 27, 2020, in Studio City, California, at the age of 86.

Filmography

References

External links
 
 

1933 births
2020 deaths
American male film actors
Place of birth missing
American male television actors
American male stage actors